Tiphys is a genus of prostigs in the family Pionidae. There are about 15 described species in Tiphys.

Species
 Tiphys americanus (Marshall, 1937)
 Tiphys brevipes Habeeb
 Tiphys cooki Smith, 1976
 Tiphys curvipes Habeeb, 1954
 Tiphys diversus (Marshall, 1929)
 Tiphys marshallae Cook, 1956
 Tiphys mitchelli Cook, 1956
 Tiphys oliveri Habeeb, 1957
 Tiphys ornatus Koch, 1836
 Tiphys pionoidellus (Habeeb)
 Tiphys scaurus (Koenike, 1892)
 Tiphys simulans (Marshall, 1924)
 Tiphys torris (Muller, 1776)
 Tiphys vernalis (Habeeb, 1954)
 Tiphys vietsi Habeeb, 1955

References

Further reading

 
 
 
 

Trombidiformes